Rodney James "Rod" Kelleher (born 8 November 1947) was a rugby union player who represented Australia.

Kelleher, a flanker, was born in Wellington and claimed a total of 2 international rugby caps for Australia.

References

Australian rugby union players
Australia international rugby union players
1947 births
Living people
Rugby union flankers